Sylvia Thompson, Mrs Luling (4 September 1902 – 27 April 1968) was an English novelist, writer and public speaker.

Life
Sylvia Thompson was born in Scotland, the daughter of Norman Arthur Thompson (founder of the Norman Thompson Flight Company) and Ethel Hannah Levis.

She attended Somerville College, Oxford like her mother. Other literary contemporaries at Somerville College included Vera Brittain, Winifred Holtby, Hilda Reid and Margaret Kennedy. She established her reputation as a public orator, and in 1932, she joined the lecture circuit in the United States.

Personal life
In 1926, she married Theodore Peter Dunham Luling (an artist known as "Peter Luling"), with whom she had three daughters: Rosemary Haughton (theologian and writer), Virginia Luling (anthropologist) and Elizabeth Dooley (actress).

Death
Sylvia Thompson Luling died on 27 April 1968, aged 65, at Reigate Heath, Surrey, England.

Works
 The Hounds of Spring (1926)
 Battle of the Horizons (1928)
 Chariot wheels (1929)
 Portrait by Caroline (1931)
 Summer's Night (1932)
 Unfinished Symphony (1933)
 Breakfast in Bed (1934)
 A Silver Rattle (1935)
 Third Act in Venice (1936)
 Recapture the Moon (1937)
 The Adventure of Christopher Columin (1939)
 The Gulls Fly Inland (1941)
 The People Opposite (1948)
 The Candle's Glory (1953)

References

External links
 

1902 births
1968 deaths
20th-century British novelists
Alumni of Somerville College, Oxford
British people of Scottish descent
Place of birth missing